Brigadier Walter Michael Wingate Gray OBE MC & Bar (17 July 1921 – 3 November 1995) was a British Army officer who became Commander SAS.

Military career
Educated at Wellington College, Wingate Gray was commissioned into the Black Watch in February 1941 during the Second World War. After serving in North Africa, he took part in the Allied invasion of Sicily in July 1943 for which he was awarded the Military Cross, and then the Normandy landings in summer 1944 for which he was awarded a bar to his MC.

He was appointed commanding officer (CO) of 22 Special Air Service Regiment in 1964 and was deployed to Borneo during the Indonesia–Malaysia confrontation and then to Aden during the Aden Emergency before becoming Commander SAS Group as a colonel in 1967. Promoted to brigadier, he went on to be Deputy Commander, Gibraltar in 1969 and then military attaché in Paris in December 1971 before retiring in 1973.

References

1921 births
1995 deaths
British military attachés
Officers of the Order of the British Empire
Recipients of the Military Cross
People educated at Wellington College, Berkshire
Black Watch officers
Special Air Service officers
British military personnel of the Aden Emergency
British military personnel of the Indonesia–Malaysia confrontation
British Army personnel of World War II
British Army brigadiers